Georgy Ivanovich Blagonravov (Russian: Георгий Иванович Благонравов; 18 May 1898 – 16 June 1938) was a Russian revolutionary and high-ranking official of the Soviet security apparatus (Cheka, OGPU, NKVD).

Biography 
Blagonravov was born into the family of a policeman. From January 1913 to May 1914 he worked as a tutor in Yegoryevsk. He graduated from the Yegoryevsk gymnasium in 1914, and entered Moscow University in the same field.

As a student at the Faculty of Law of Moscow University, he joined the revolutionary movement.

In May 1915 he was drafted into the Imperial Army. After graduating from the Alexander Military School, he served in the 80th reserve infantry regiment in Yegorievsk. In February 1917 he was elected chairman of the regimental committee, and in March he joined the Bolsheviks, then became chairman of the Yegoryevsk Soviet of Workers' and Soldiers' Deputies.

At the 1st All-Russian Congress of Soviets he was elected a member of the All-Russian Central Executive Committee, where he worked as secretary of the Bolshevik faction. He was a member of the Military Organization under the Central Committee of the RSDLP(b). 

He took an active part in the October armed uprising in Petrograd. On October 23  (November 5), Blagonravov was appointed by the Petrograd Military Revolutionary Committee as commissar of the Peter and Paul Fortress, whose guns fired at the Winter Palace on October 25 (November 7). By order of the Military Revolutionary Committee, Blagonravov prepared cells in the Trubetskoy Bastion for the arrested ministers of the Provisional Government. From December 1917 he worked as an extraordinary commissar for the protection of Petrograd. From November to December 1917 he was commandant of the Peter and Paul Fortress, then until May 1918 was extraordinary commissar for the protection of Petrograd. He headed the Committee for Combating Pogroms, created on December 2, 1917.

From June to July 1918, Blagonravov was a member of the Revolutionary Military Council of the Eastern Front where he participated in the fight against the Czechoslovak Corps and in the suppression of the Yaroslavl rebellion. From November 1918 he worked in the Cheka in various positions and was heavily involved in the Red Terror. From  1921 to 1922 he was head of the transport department of the Cheka, and from February 1922 to October 1931 head of the transport department of the GPU and OGPU. From October 26, 1929 to October 7, 1931, he was a member of the board of the OGPU.

From December to October 1931, Blagonravov worked as Deputy People's Commissar of Railways, and from October 7, 1931, as second Deputy People's Commissar of Railways of the USSR. September 21, 1932 became the 1st Deputy People's Commissar of Railways of the USSR.

At the 17th Congress of the All-Union Communist Party (b) in February 1934, he was elected a candidate member of the Central Committee.

On August 3, 1935, he headed the Central Administration of Highways and Motor Transport under the Council of People's Commissars of the Soviet Union. On March 27, 1936, he headed the Main Directorate for the Construction of Highways of the NKVD and from July 5 of the same year, he was Commissar of State Security of the 1st rank.

On May 25, 1937 he was arrested. On December 2, 1937 he was convicted of “participation in the anti-Soviet organizations in the NKVD. He was shot on June 16, 1938, together with a group of senior NKVD officers, and was buried at the Kommunarka shooting ground.

Blagonravov was posthumously rehabilitated in 1956 and reinstated in the party in the same year.

References

1898 births
1938 deaths
NKVD officers
Cheka officers
Bolsheviks
Russian revolutionaries
All-Russian Central Executive Committee members
Central Committee of the Communist Party of the Soviet Union members
Central Committee of the Communist Party of the Soviet Union candidate members
Recipients of the Order of the Red Banner
Great Purge victims from Russia
Soviet rehabilitations